Richard Woods is an American politician and educator who is currently the Georgia Superintendent of Schools, a position he was elected to in 2014. He was reelected to his position in 2018, defeating his Democratic opponent Otha Thornton with slightly over 53% of the vote.

Woods received his bachelor's degree from Kennesaw State University and his master's degree from Valdosta State University. His career in education has spanned over twenty-five years, including fourteen in the classroom as a high school teacher. He spent an additional eight years working as a school administrator, in positions such as assistant principal and alternative school director. Woods also worked as a purchasing agent for a multi-national laser company and has been a small business owner.

Personal life
Woods was born in Pensacola, Florida as part of a military family. The family moved frequently, living in California, Hawaii, and Virginia before finally settling in Georgia. Woods is a graduate of Fitzgerald High School. He is married to Lisha, a retired educator of thirty years, and has been a long-time resident of Tifton.

References

Georgia (U.S. state) politicians
Georgia (U.S. state) Republicans
Kennesaw State University alumni
Living people
People from Pensacola, Florida
People from Tifton, Georgia
Valdosta State University alumni
Year of birth missing (living people)
Georgia Superintendent of Schools